Aumale is a Brussels Metro station on the western branch of line 5. It is located in the municipality of Anderlecht, in the western part of Brussels, Belgium. It takes its name from /, the street above ground.

The station opened on 6 October 1982 as part of the Beekkant–Saint Guidon/Sint-Guido extension of former line 1B. Following the reorganisation of the Brussels Metro on 4 April 2009, it is served by line 5.

External links

Brussels metro stations
Railway stations opened in 1982
Anderlecht
1982 establishments in Belgium